Bacteridiella is a genus of small sea snails, marine gastropod mollusks in the family Pyramidellidae, the pyrams and their allies.

Species
 Bacteridiella filiformis Saurin, 1959
The following species were brought into synonymy:
 The unaccepted species Bacteridiella gofasi Schander, 1994: synonym of  Eulimella gofasi (Schander, 1994)

References

 Saurin, E. 1959. Pyramidellidae de Nhatrang (Vietnam). Annales de la Faculté des Sciences (Saigon) 1959: 223-283, pls. 1-9

External links
 To World Register of Marine Species

Pyramidellidae